Pilgrims of the Night is a 1921 American drama film directed by Edward Sloman and starring Lewis Stone, Rubye De Remer and William V. Mong. It is based on the 1910 novel Passers-By by the British writer E. Phillips Oppenheim.

Synopsis
After serving a prison term to protect his wife, an English aristocrat goes into exile in Paris where he becomes involved with a shady gambling organisation.

Cast
 Lewis Stone as Philip Champion / Lord Ellingham
 Rubye De Remer as Christine 
 William V. Mong as Ambrose 
 Kathleen Kirkham as Lady Ellingham 
 Raymond Hatton as Le Blun 
 Walter McGrail as Gilbert Hannaway 
 Frank Leigh as Marcel

References

Bibliography
 Goble, Alan. The Complete Index to Literary Sources in Film. Walter de Gruyter, 1999.

External links

1921 films
1921 drama films
Silent American drama films
Films directed by Edward Sloman
American silent feature films
1920s English-language films
American black-and-white films
Films set in London
Films set in Paris
Films based on British novels
1920s American films